Car-Man is a Russian technopop band. It was one of the top Soviet/Russian bands in the early and mid nineties.  Car-Man created a massive fan following that ranged from music and dance to hair styles and speech. The band won a number of top prizes in 1991.

Car-Man was formed in 1989 by Sergey Lemokh and Bogdan Titomir. Their debut album called Vokrug sveta was very successful because of very exotic sound and style and for soviet pop scene. In 1991 the band had split - Lemokh stayed with Car-Man, while Titomir started a solo project, with debut album called Vysokaya Energya.

Car-Man released 6 major albums and number of secondary albums of live and re-mixed music.

Discography

Studio albums

Remix albums

Live albums

Compilation albums

References

External links
 Official Site
 Fan Site
 Кар-Мэн на Discogs

Russian musicians
Techno musicians
Russian pop music groups
Russian musical duos
Pop music duos
Musical groups from Moscow
Musical groups established in 1989
1989 establishments in the Soviet Union
1989 establishments in Russia